Samudera LRT station is an elevated Light Rail Transit (LRT) station on the Punggol LRT line West Loop in Punggol, Singapore, located along Punggol Way near the junction of Northshore Walk. It is situated near the Marina Country Club and Northshore Plaza.

Etymology
The Malay word Samudera means "ocean".

History

On 29 December 2016, SBS Transit announced that the station will open in March 2017 and will be connected to the neighbouring Ponggol Seventeenth Avenue Estate and Northshore Plaza. On 20 March 2017, SBS Transit announced that the station will open to provide better connectivity for commuters to access the Marina Country Club. The station opened for passenger service on 31st of that same month.

References

External links

Railway stations in Singapore opened in 2017
Punggol
LRT stations in Punggol
Railway stations in Punggol
Light Rail Transit (Singapore) stations